Polissia Okruha was an administrative division of the Ukrainian State (Ukraine) that was created on August 14, 1918 by the resolution of the Council of Ministries. The okruha was governed by a starosta from Mozyr (today Belarus). The territory was named after its historical location Polesia (Polissia in Ukrainian).

Subdivisions
 Mozyr County
 Richytsia County
 Pinsk County
 Slutsk County (southern part)
 Bobruisk County (southern part)

See also
 Administrative divisions of Ukraine (1918-1925)

External links
 Boiko, O. Territory, borders and administrative-territorial division of the Skoropadsky's Ukrainian State. Regional History of Ukraine. "Collection of science articles". 2009.

Okruhas of Ukraine
States and territories established in 1918
States and territories disestablished in 1918